Panhandle 38 (Italian: ...e alla fine lo chiamarono Jerusalem l'implacabile, also known as Padella calibro 38 and Panhandle Calibre 38) is a 1972 Italian comedy-western film. The film represents the debut and the only film directed by Toni Secchi, that had previously been the cinematographer of a number of successful spaghetti westerns. It was also the only leading role for Scott Holden, the son of William Holden and Brenda Marshall, who had a brief film career in early 70s.

Cast 
Scott Holden: Jessie Bronson / Jerusalem
Keenan Wynn: Billy Bronson / Kile Richards
Delia Boccardo: Connie Briscott
Philippe Leroy: General Briscott
Franco Fabrizi: Fernand
Mimmo Palmara: Sheriff 
Remo Capitani: El Tornado (credited as Ray O'Connor)
Giorgio Trestini: Bobo Bison
Nello Pazzafini: Bullseye Joe 
Giorgio White: Chief Black Eagle

References

External links

1972 films
Spaghetti Western films
1972 Western (genre) films
Films scored by Franco Micalizzi
1972 directorial debut films
1970s Italian films